Ilumatobacter is a  genus from the order Acidimicrobiales.

References

Further reading 
 
 

Actinomycetota
Bacteria genera